Integrated Telecom Company (Salam), It is currently known by its trade name Salam  is a telecom provider established in 2005 offering broadband, interconnection and Satellite services for businesses, consumers and wholesale segments of the Saudi market.

Salam is part of Mawarid Holding Group of Companies, a diversified Saudi conglomerate. The Group consists of 27 subsidiaries engaged in 4 major business areas, including media and communications, investment services, projects, and trading.

Infrastructure 
Salam owns Data Service Provider (DSP), Internet Service  (ISP) and VSAT license, 6 data centers as well as an independent infrastructure that includes two International Cable Landing Stations in Al Khobar and Jeddah connecting the Kingdom to the rest of the world through submarine cables. These gateways are, in turn, connected to all cities in the Kingdom through a 17,000-kilometer Saudi National Fiber Network (SNFN).

In addition, Salam owns 10 metro-fiber rings spanning all major cities. These fiber optic rings are based on top-of-the-line SDH and DWDM technologies for data transfers, delivering local and international telecom services and helping ensure FTTx connectivity Kingdom wide.

List of products and services
The following list of products are provided by Salam:

Fiber Internet to the home FTTH 
5G Internet
Fixed Voice Services
National Data Connectivity
International Data Connectivity
Satellite Services VSAT
Internet Services
Cloud Computing
Data Center Management
Co-location
Business Continuity Suite
Managed Router

ITC OFFICE gateway road 
Integrated Telecom Company launched Saudi Executive Cloud to provide variety of value added Cloud services.

The Cloud products are:

Virtual Private Server 
Backup as a Service (BaaS)
Virtual Firewall
Hosted MS Exchange
Web Security
Secure Email Gateway
Web hosting

References

External links
 Salam Website

2005 establishments in Saudi Arabia
Telecommunications companies of Saudi Arabia
Telecommunications companies established in 2005
Companies based in Riyadh